Domenico "Mimmo" Battaglia (born 20 January 1963) is an Italian prelate of the Catholic Church who has been the Bishop of Cerreto Sannita-Telese-Sant'Agata de' Goti since 2016. He is currently the Archbishop of Naples.

Biography

Domenico Battaglia was born on 20 January 1963 in Satriano in the province of Catanzaro. He studied philosophy and theology at the Pontifical Regional Seminary San Pio X in Catanzaro. After being ordained a priest on 6 February 1988, he was Rector of the Archiepiscopal Preparatory Seminary of Catanzaro and a member of the Diocesan Commission for Justice and Peace from 1989 to 1992, parish administrator in Sant'Elia, parish priest of Madonna del Carmine in Catanzaro, Director of the Diocesan Office for Missionary Cooperation between Churches, and parish priest in Satriano from 1992 to 1999. He was collaborator of the Shrine of Santa Maria delle Grazie in Torre di Ruggiero, parish collaborator in Montepaone Lido and administrator of the parish of Santa Maria di Altavilla in Satriano.

In 1992 he became President of the Calabrese Solidarity Center, which supports efforts to recover from drug addiction and is associated with the Italian Federation of Therapeutic Communities ( or FICT). From 2000 to 2006 he was Vice President of the Bethany Foundation a non-profit organization that operates rehabilitation centers and residential healthcare facilities in the provinces of Catanzaro and Vibo Valentia. From 2006 to 2015 he was National President of FICT.

Pope Francis named him Bishop of Cerreto Sannita-Telese-Sant’Agata de 'Goti on 24 June 2016. He was the first priest of the diocese to become a bishop since 1960. He received his episcopal consecration on 3 September from Archbishop Vincenzo Bertolone and was installed on 2 October. He chose as his episcopal motto "Confide Surge Vocat Te" (Take heart, Stand Up, He is Calling) from Mark 10:49. While a bishop, he continued his work as a "street priest", which earned him the sobriquet "Bergoglio of the South". In a pastoral letter in April 2020, he said that the COVID-19 pandemic had "exposed the fragility of this world of ours ... the weakness of that economy which, both locally and globally, was considered the single goal, and was seen and applauded as the only route, without any restraints, to human happiness on earth".

Pope Francis appointed him Archbishop of Naples on 12 December 2020. His installation is scheduled for 2 February 2021.

Notes

References

External links

  

Living people
1963 births
People from the Province of Catanzaro
21st-century Italian Roman Catholic bishops
Archbishops of Naples
21st-century Italian Roman Catholic archbishops